Maruia Springs is a settlement in the West Coast Region of New Zealand's South Island. It is located on the south bank of the Maruia River on State Highway 7 to the west of the Lewis Pass.

The settlement is named for the nearby hot springs. While not as commercially exploited as other southern hot water springs (such as those at Hanmer Springs) it is still a popular spot with visitors. The hot spring is probably fed through the nearby Awatere Fault.

References

Populated places in the West Coast, New Zealand
Hot springs of New Zealand